The PFA Scotland Manager of the Year is awarded by the Professional Footballers' Association Scotland to the football manager in Scottish football who is seen to have been the best manager over the previous season. The award replaced, and is considered a direct continuation of, the SPFA Manager of the Year award which was awarded just once, in the 2006–07 season to Celtic boss Gordon Strachan.

List of winners
As of 2022, the award has been presented 15 times and won by 14 different managers. Gordon Strachan (2) is the only manager who has won the award more than once.

Winners by club

See also
SFWA Manager of the Year

References

Scotland
Scottish football trophies and awards
Awards established in 2007
2007 establishments in Scotland